Elvis Joseph (born August 30, 1978 in St. Michael, Barbados) is a former running back in the NFL. He played three years in the NFL from 2001 to 2003 for the Jacksonville Jaguars. He is distinguished as being the first Bajan to play in the National Football League.

References

1978 births
Living people
American football running backs
Edmonton Elks players
Jacksonville Jaguars players
Louisiana Ragin' Cajuns football players
Southern Jaguars football players
People from Saint Michael, Barbados
Barbadian players of American football
People from Marrero, Louisiana